The Wildkogel is a  high grass mountain in the Kitzbühel Alps in Oberpinzgau in Salzburg. It lies north of the Salzach river valley and the nearby towns of Neukirchen and Bramberg.

There is a 6-seater cable car with a stopover, a six-chairlift, two four-chair lifts, one double chairlift, five lift-e and four T-bar lifts. Descents are possible into the towns of Neukirchen (length ) and Bramberg (length ).

In the summer season, there are many hiking possibilities (altitude hiking). The Wildkogel offers cycling for mountain bikes ( "Bike-Arena"), and also the participants of the yearly held Transalp have to cross. The mountain is also a popular starting point for cross-country flights with the paraglider, as the Pinzgau is thermally very reliable.

References

External links 
 http://www.skiarena-wildkogel.at
 http://www.urlaubsarena-wildkogel.at
 http://www.wildkogelbahnen.at
 http://www.wildkogelhaus.de

Mountains of Salzburg (state)
Mountains of the Alps
Kitzbühel Alps